Klipfish is any of various species of fish of the family Clinidae from South Africa:
 Agile klipfish Clinus agilis
 Barbelled klipfish Cirrhibarbis capensis
 Bearded klipfish Pavoclinus mentalis
 Bluespotted klipfish Pavoclinus caeruleopunctatus
 Bluntnose klipfish Clinus cottoides
 Bot River klipfish Clinus spatulatus
 Bull klipfish Clinus taurus
 Cape klipfish Clinus brevicristatus
 Chinese klipfish Clinus nematopterus
 Deep-reef klipfish Pavoclinus smalei
 Deepwater klipfish Pavoclinus profundus
 False Bay klipfish Clinus latipennis
 Fleet Klipfish Climacoporus navalis
 Grass klipfish Pavoclinus graminis
 Helen's klipfish Clinus helenae
 Highfin Klipfish Clinus superciliosus
 Kelp klipfish Clinus rotundifrons
 Lace klipfish Blennioclinus brachycephalus
 Ladder klipfish Clinoporus biporosus
 Leafy klipfish Smithichthys fucorum
 Leprous platanna-klipfish Xenopoclinus leprosus
 Mousey klipfish Fucomimus mus
 Mya's klipfish Pavoclinus myae
 Nosestripe klipfish Muraenoclinus dorsalis
 Oldman klipfish Clinus woodi
 Peacock klipfish Pavoclinus pavo
 Platanna klipfish Xenopoclinus kochi
 Rippled klipfish Pavoclinus laurentii
 Robust klipfish Clinus robustus
 Sad klipfish Clinus acuminatus
 Silverbubble klipfish Blennioclinus stella
 Slender platanna-klipfish Cancelloxus burrelli
 Slinky klipfish Pavoclinus litorafontis
 Snaky klipfish Blennophis anguillaris
 Speckled klipfish Clinus venustris
 Striped klipfish Blennophis striatus
 Super klipfish Clinus superciliosus
 Westcoast klipfish Clinus heterodon
 Whiteblotched klipfish Cancelloxus elongatus